Diane Kurys (born 3 December 1948) is a French director, producer, filmmaker and actress. Several of her films as director are semi-autobiographical.

Personal life
Kurys was born in Lyon, Rhône, France, the younger of two daughters. She is a daughter of Russian and Polish Jewish immigrants, Lena and Michel. Diane Kurys and her older sister spent their early years in Lyon. Like many of her film's characters, she had a difficult relationship with her parents, and her traumatic childhood became a subject in many of her films. Their parents met and got married at Camp de Rivesaltes in 1942, separating in 1954. Their divorce deeply marked and affected Diane, and would become a real source of inspiration for several of her films; Kurys stated that she made films about them because she “wanted to see them back together again.” It was after this event that her mom decided to move with her two daughters to Paris, where she ran a woman’s fashion boutique, while her dad stayed in Lyon where he ran a men's clothing store. She lived with her mother after their divorce in 1954, at one point running away to join her father at age sixteen.

In her adolescence, she was radicalized in the spirit of May of '68, but became somewhat disillusioned in the aftermath, calling it a "revolution bourgeois" in an interview with Jean-Luc Wachthausen. She first met her partner and fellow filmmaker Alexandre Arcady when she was fifteen years old, in 1964, and went to live in Israel in a kibbutz near the Lebanese border. They have been a couple since the 1960s and have two production companies together. Their son Yasha, born in 1991, is an author writing under the name Sacha Sperling.

Acting career
As a student at the Jules Ferry high school, she studied modern literature at the Sorbonne before becoming a teacher and then a theatre actress in the 1970s, joining the Madeleine Renaud: Jean-Louis Barrault's company with Antoine Bourseiller and Ariane Mnouchkine at La Cartoucherie or Cafe de la Gare.

After the student revolt in May 1967, Kurys left University and along with Arcady began her involvement in theatre; initially, with Kurys as an actor, and Alexandre as both an actor and director. She acted in theatre, film, and television for eight years. Kurys mentions how she loved the environment of acting but she was not happy doing it as she couldn’t express herself and was often seen as rebellious. She felt unable to express herself under "the director or any kind of authority or control." This led to her transitioning into writing and film making.

Film directing
In 1975, she worked with Philippe Adrien to adapt Lanford Wilson's Hôtel Baltimore, which she performed at the Espace Cardin. Phillipe Adrien had taught Diane all the basics of filming within half an hour, and she decided to film things in the way she sees them. The following year, she began writing an autobiographical novel in 1977 with a government grant which became the screenplay for the film Diabolo Menthe (Peppermint Soda). Set in 1963, it follows a girl named Anne losing her childhood innocence. It explores her life as a child of divorced parents and her relationship with her sister, to whom she dedicated the movie. In an interview, Kurys said her inspiration came from the autobiographical genre: "from myself, my own life, my own experience". Diane Kurys' talent for portraying her characters' feelings accurately and realistically made the film a great critical and public success.

Cocktail Molotov (1980) was her next film. Featuring François Cluzet, Élise Caron and Philippe Lebas, highlighting the Paris student movement in May 1968 through the point of view of three children: Anne, Frank, and Bruno.

In Coup de foudre (1983) (fr. Entre Nous), the issue of divorce is revisited, with Isabelle Huppert playing the heroine's mother as she leaves her father and goes to Paris with her friend and children. The film also stars Miou-Miou, Isabelle Huppert, Guy Marchand, and Jean-Pierre Bacri. In this film, inspired by Diane Kurys' family memories, she makes a point of honoring the emotional manners of the 1940s and 1950s. The film is well known, winning numerous awards in festivals and was nominated in 1984 for a Cesar for best foreign film and best original screenplay.

For the opening of the 40th edition of the Cannes Film Festival, Diane Kurys features Peter Coyote, Greta Scacchi, Claudia Cardinale, Jamie Lee Curtis and Vincent Lindon in A Man in Love (1987 film), (fr. Une Homme Amoureux). At the film's conclusion, Scacchi's character gives up acting to become a writer; echoing Kurys's own transition in life. This was Diane's first english-language production as well as the first movie that was more present to its time period in the 1950 as it focused on the events leading up to the suicide of Italian writer, Cesare Pavese.

The year 1989 marked a turning point in Diane Kurys' career C'est la vie (fr. La Baule-les-Pins) (1990) which featured Nathalie Baye, Richard Berry, Vincent Lindon, Zabou, Jean-Pierre Bacri, Valéria Bruni Tedeschi and Emmanuelle Boidron. The film returned to her alter-ego leading character's adolescent years and was seen as a turning point in Diane Kurys' career.

Two years later, Love After Love (1992) (fr. Après l'amour) was debuted and featured Isabelle Huppert, Bernard Giraudeau, Lio, and Hippolyte Girardot, followed by Six Days, Six Nights (fr. À la folie) (1994) which examined the relationship between two adult sisters starring Anne Parillaud, Béatrice Dalle and Patrick Aurignac.

In 1998, she also directed the period film Children of the Century (Les Enfants du siècle 1999) with Juliette Binoche and Benoît Magime which tells the story of the meeting between George Sand and Alfred de Musset. An exhibition on the film was held at the Museum of Romantic Life in 1999.

Her ninth film was released in 2003: Je reste! with Sophie Marceau, Charles Berling and Vincent Pérez.

The Anniversary (fr. L'anniversaire) was released in 2005. It features Lambert Wilson, Pierre Palmade, Jean-Hugues Anglade, Antoine Duléry, Michèle Laroque, Zoé Félix, Philippe Bas.

Four years later, in 2008, the biopic about Françoise Sagan called Sagan was released. Starring Sylvie Testud, Denis Podalydès, Pierre Palmade, Jeanne Balibar, Guillaume Gallienne, and Arielle Dombasle.

Her latest film is Pour une femme, released in 2013, was shot in Lyon during the summer of 2012 which stars Benoît Magimel, Mélanie Thierry and Nicolas Duvauchelle Clotilde Hesme, Julie Ferrier, Sylvie Testud and Denis Podalydès. The film is her take on an affair as a result of her parents' messy marriage and divorce. In this case focusing on her fathers point of view while Entre Nous, otherwise known as, Coup de foudre, is her mother's take on the subject. The film won in CoLCoA French Film Festival in 2014.

In 2016, she produced and directed her thirteenth film, adapted from Sylvie Testud's book C'est le métier qui rentre (Arrete ton cinema) (published by Fayard), a comedy that tells the story of the setbacks of a famous actress to whom two extravagant producers offer to make a film. The cast includes Josiane Balasko, Zabou Breitman, Sylvie Testud, Fred Testot, François Xavier Demaison, Claire Keim, Virginie Hocq, Hélène de Fougerolles and Florence Thomassin.

In 2018, it is the release of the film My mother is crazy, with Fanny Ardant, Vianney, Patrick Chesnais and Arielle Dombasle. Written by Sacha Sperling and Pietro Caracciolo, the film tells the story of a slightly crazy mother's reunion with her slightly too wise son during a trip to Rotterdam.

Critical reception 
Although Kurys' work as a filmmaker in the 1980s helped bring women's filmmaking into the mainstream of its time, her commercial successes have played a part in keeping her from being granted auteur status by many critics. Her harsher critics have called her films conventional, polished, and not challenging to cinema's status quo. In addition, her ambivalence toward feminism and dislike of the "woman director" or "women's cinema" label has played a part in her lack of feminist film study scholarship. 

In a section on Kurys for French Film: texts and contexts and the first book-length study of Kurys work, film scholar Carrie Tarr argues that her work is firmly within the auteurist tradition, "a coherent body of work with a recognizable style". Kurys' use of her own life story, her inclusion of a stand-in for herself in most films, the recurring character types and situations from her memories and concerns in her present, all create a body of work specifically centered on a unique female voice. Tarr theorizes that Kurys' signature contains two voices, one which reflect her rebellion against the male-centric world she meant to escape by turning from acting to filmmaking, and the other which collaborates with the patriarchal structure she still must operate within to be successful.

Production companies
Alexandre Films was formed in 1977 with Alexandre Arcady before the release of Peppermint Soda. The company co-produced her first six films as well as a number of Arcady's, whose name it bears. The pair formed New Light Films in 1994, which produces films in both French and English.

Selected filmography

Director

Actress

Literature
 Carrie Tarr: Diane Kurys. Manchester University Press, New York, 1999,

Notes

References
Austin, Guy. Contemporary French cinema: an introduction. Manchester and New York: Manchester University Press, 2008.
Foster, Gwendolyn Audrey. Women Film Directors: an International Bio-critical Dictionary. Westport: Greenwood Press, 1995.
Gordon, Bette. Diane Kurys, ‘’BOMB Magazine’’ Fall, 1987. Retrieved on [3 April 2013.]
Rège, Philippe. Encyclopedia of French Film Directors, Volume 1. Lanham: Scarecrow Press, 2010.
Tarr, Carrie. Diane Kurys. Manchester and New York: Manchester University Press, 1999.
Tarr, Carrie. "Maternal legacies: Diane Kurys' Coup de foudre (1983)." French film: texts and contexts. Ed. Susan Hayward and Ginette Vincendeau. London and New York: Routledge, 2000.

External links 

Alexandre Films/New Light Films

1948 births
Living people
French film actresses
French film directors
French women screenwriters
20th-century French actresses
Mass media people from Lyon
French women film directors
French people of Russian-Jewish descent
French people of Polish-Jewish descent